Ichneutica alopa is a moth of the family Noctuidae. It is endemic to New Zealand and is found in the central and southern parts of the North Island as well as in the South Island. It inhabits tussock grasslands and wetlands and can occur at ranges from the alpine zone down to almost sea-level. The life history of this species is unknown as are the host species of its larvae in the wild. Larvae of this species have been raised in captivity on Sphagnum moss as well as on species in the genus Raoulia. Adults of this species are on the wing from late January to April and are attracted to light and to sugar traps. I. alope can be confused with I. agorastis, I. micrastra or I. sapiens but the latter three species can be distinguished externally from I. alope through differences in size, forewing pattern and the antennae of the male of the species.

Taxonomy 
It was described by Edward Meyrick in 1887 from specimens collected near Lake Coleridge and Lake Guyon in Canterbury in March. Meyrick originally named the species Leucania alopa. The male lectotype is held at the Canterbury Museum. 

J. S. Dugdale discussed this species in his 1988 catalogue and placed it within the Tmetolophota genus. In 2019 Robert Hoare undertook a major review of New Zealand Noctuidae. During this review the genus Ichneutica was greatly expanded and the genus Tmetolophota was subsumed into that genus as a synonym. As a result of this review, this species is now known as Ichneutica alopa.

Description 
Meyrick described the species as follows:
 Both the adult male and female of this species have wingspans of between 39 and 45 mm. I. alope can be confused with I. agorastis, I. micrastra or I. sapiens but the latter species can be distinguished externally from I. alope through differences in size, forewing pattern and the antennae of the male of the species.

Distribution 
It is endemic to New Zealand. This species is found in the central and southern parts of the North Island as well as in the South Island.

Habitat 
This species inhabits tussock grasslands and wetlands and can occur at ranges from the alpine zone down to almost sea-level.

Behaviour 
Adults of this species are on the wing from late January to April. They are attracted to light and to sugar traps.

Life history and host species 

The life history of this species is unknown as are the host species of its larvae in the wild. Larvae of this species have been raised in captivity on Sphagnum moss as well as on species in the genus Raoulia.

References

Moths described in 1887
Moths of New Zealand
Hadeninae
Endemic fauna of New Zealand
Taxa named by Edward Meyrick
Endemic moths of New Zealand